Professor Sheila Dinotshe Tlou is a Botswana nurse, specialist in HIV/AIDS and women's health, and a nursing educator. She was Minister of Health from 2004 to 2008. Professor Tlou is a distinguished advocate for human resources for health issues. She is a  recognized visionary leader and champion.

Education 
She grew up in Botswana, she attended a school taught by Irish nuns—she had a gift for languages and drama, which motivated her  career in Hollywood dream. Tlou graduated from Dillard University in 1974.  In 2014 she was awarded an Honorary degree by her alma mater. Tlou studied at Teachers College, Columbia University, U.S., obtaining an M.A. in Education (concentrating in Curriculum and Instruction in the Health Sciences).  She took her PhD in community health nursing and a diploma in gender issues, at the University of Illinois at Chicago in 1990.

Career
Tlou has taught at the University of Botswana since1980. From 1994 to 1996 she was head of Nursing Education, becoming an associate professor in 1999, and 2002–04 she was the university's HIV/AIDS coordinator.

Tlou represented Botswana at the 1995 Fourth World Conference on Women in Beijing. In 2002 she was appointed to a special UN task force on girls, women, and HIV/AIDS in southern Africa. She has also provided consultancy to UNAIDS, the UN Commission on the Status of Women and the World Health Organization. She took part in the international community educator meetings for the HIV Vaccine Trials Network. She served for seven years as UNAIDS regional director for Eastern and Southern Africa, where she provided leadership and political advocacy for the AIDS response in 21 African countries.

She has portrayed Precious Ramotswe, the heroine of Alexander McCall Smith's The No. 1 Ladies' Detective Agency book series, in amateur theater productions, and at one time was mentioned in media reports as a possible choice to portray Mma Ramotswe in the Hollywood film adaptation currently in production.

Tlou is currently the co-chair of the Nursing Now Global Campaign and Global HIV Prevention Coalition. Now Global Campaign aims to raise the status and profile of nursing for Universal Health Coverage.Global HIV Prevention Coalition was born out of the need to address the gap and rise in new infections, despite success in treatment and care. She is also Botswana Open University (BOU) Chancellor, an appointment bestowed upon her by the President of the Republic of Botswana, Dr. E. K.Mokgweetsi Masisi from May 2021 to April 2026. Professor Tlou replaces Dr. PHK Kedikilwe, who retired as Chancellor at the end of 2020.

Tlou is married to Botswana historian Professor Thomas Tlou.

Positions Held 
Following the October 2004 general election, Tlou was appointed as Minister of Health on November 9, 2004. After being defeated in primary elections of the Botswana Democratic Party (BDP) in Palapye, Tlou was dismissed from the Cabinet on April 1, 2008, when Ian Khama took office as President.

HIV/AIDS prevention and treatment
Much of Tlou's work focuses on gender issues and HIV/AIDS in southern Africa. Enabling women, particularly married women, in a patriarchal society to negotiate with their partner for safe sex has major consequences for HIV transmission. Tlou has worked with grassroots women's organisations and national campaigns to increase AIDS awareness in Botswana. She has also done a great deal of work in reducing the stigma of AIDS and helping HIV positive people cope with their lives.

Awards
 May 2002 Anna Reynvaan prize, and gave prize lecture (Netherlands)
 September 2002 Presidential Order of Honour (Botswana)
 2003 Florence Nightingale Medal (International Committee of the Red Cross)
2014 Princess Srinagarinda Award
2017 Christiane Reimann Awards
2018 HRH Princess Muna Al Hussein Award

Works
Tlou is a co-editor of the comprehensive reference book for people working in the field of HIV/AIDS in Africa:
 

Selected other works:
 
 
 
 
 
 
 
 
Tlou, Sheila D. (1998). "Outcomes of a community-based HIV/AIDS education programme in Botswana". Southern African Journal of Gerontology. 7 (2): 23-26.

References

External links
 
 

Year of birth missing (living people)
Living people
HIV/AIDS activists
HIV/AIDS in Africa
Botswana nurses
Members of the National Assembly (Botswana)
Teachers College, Columbia University alumni
University of Illinois Chicago alumni
Botswana Democratic Party politicians
Botswana expatriates in the United States
Academic staff of the University of Botswana
Women government ministers of Botswana
Health ministers of Botswana
Members of the National Academy of Medicine
Florence Nightingale Medal recipients
Dillard University alumni
21st-century Botswana women politicians
21st-century Botswana politicians